Divine providence ( Hashgochoh Protis or Hashgaha Peratit, lit. divine supervision of the individual) is discussed throughout rabbinic literature, by the classical Jewish philosophers, and by the tradition of Jewish mysticism.

The discussion brings into consideration the Jewish understanding of nature, and its reciprocal, the miraculous. This analysis thus underpins much of Orthodox Judaism's world view, particularly as regards questions of interaction with the natural world, and the need for skills and personal effort (Hishtadlus/Hishtadlut in Hebrew).

Classical Jewish philosophy
Divine providence is discussed by all of the major Jewish philosophers, but its extent and nature is a matter of dispute. There are, broadly, two views, differing largely as to the frequency with which God intervenes in the natural order. The first view admits a frequency of miracles.  Here there is a stability of the natural order which nevertheless allows for the interference of God in the regulation of human events, or even in disturbing the natural order on occasion. The second, rationalist view does not deny the occurrence of miracles, but attempts to limit it, and will rationalize the numerous miraculous events related in the Bible and bring them within the sphere of the natural order.

Nachmanides

The teachings of Nachmanides are largely representative of the first view. He holds that the Creator endowed the universe with physical properties, and sustains the natural order, and that any act of providence involves, by definition, an intrusion into the laws of nature. In the absence of providential interference, cause and effect governs the affairs of the universe. In Ramban's view, reward and punishment — as well as guidance of the fate of Israel — are the typical expressions of such providence (see Ramban: Torat Hashem Temimah). In this sense there is no difference between God causing it to rain (as a reward) and his separating the waters of the Red Sea. Both are the result of Divine intervention.

All events (natural or providential) are the result of the direct will of God, and, as such, the seemingly natural order of the world is an illusion. At the same time, any (obvious) breach in the chain of causality involves a "compromise" in the default cause and effect nature of the universe — providence is thus exercised sparingly, and in a "seemingly natural" manner (Genesis 6:19 ad loc). Thus, whereas the fate of the Jews as a nation is guided by providence, individuals do not enjoy the same providential relationship with the Almighty. Only the righteous and the wicked can expect providential treatment. The fate of more “average” individuals is primarily guided by natural law (Deuteronomy 11:13 ad loc).

David Berger has argued that Nachmanides did subscribe to the existence of a natural order.<ref>Cultures in Collision and Conversation by
 David Berger, (Academic Studies Press, 2011), pp.129-151</ref>

Maimonides

Maimonides is representative of the rationalist school. He holds that the pattern of nature is basically immutable. "This Universe remains perpetually with the same properties with which the Creator has endowed it ... none of these will ever be changed except by way of miracle in some individual instances", (The Guide for the Perplexed, 2:29). This notwithstanding, Maimonides believes that God rewards and punishes appropriately.

To some extent, Maimonides reconciles the two views by defining providence as an essentially natural process. Here individual providence depends on the development of the human mind: that is, the more a man develops his mind the more he is subject to the providence of God. Providence is, in fact, a function of intellectual and spiritual activity: it is the activity, not the person that merits providence. "Divine Providence is connected with Divine intellectual influence, and the same beings which are benefited by the latter so as to become intellectual, and to comprehend things comprehensible to rational beings, are also under the control of Divine Providence, which examines all their deeds in order to reward or punish them." (The Guide for the Perplexed 3:17).Consistent with Maimonides, Sefer ha-Chinuch - 512 Not to mutter incantations, on Deuteronomy 18:11 – states that the practice of saying Tehillim in times of need is designed not to achieve divine favour, but rather to inculcate into one’s consciousness the idea of divine providence.

Further, by defining providence as function of human activity, Maimonides avoids the problem of how God can be affected by events on Earth, lessening any implication of change within God and the resultant implication of a lack of perfection (see Divine simplicity). Maimonides views "reward and punishment" as manifesting in the World to Come as opposed to in this world (see Talmud, Kiddushin 39b; Pirkei Avot 2:16) — he therefore defines divine providence as that which facilitates intellectual attainment as opposed to as an instrument of reward and punishment.

Contemporary Orthodox thought
Both of the above approaches continue to influence contemporary Orthodox Judaism. In general, Nachmanides' view is influential in Haredi Judaism, while Maimonides' view — in addition to Nachmanides' — underpins much of Modern Orthodox thought. Note that the Hassidic approach departs somewhat from these; see detail below.

The difference between the approaches of Nachmanides and Rambam manifests particularly in the importance assigned to, and attitudes toward, three areas:
 Derech Eretz (דרך ארץ): involvement with the natural world, particularly for purposes of livelihood.
 Technology: the use and manipulation of nature.
 Madda (מדע): knowledge of the functioning of nature and society, both to facilitate derech eretz and as a complement to Torah study.

Haredi Judaism
The view of Rabbi Eliyahu Eliezer Dessler is representative of the Haredi approach. To generalise, Rabbi Dessler (along with the Chazon Ish) teaches that given the illusory "nature of nature", each individual must find their appropriate balance between personal effort (hishtadlus / hishtadlut השתדלות) and trust (bitochon / bitachon ביטחון). "Rav Dessler", relatedly, often repeated the idea that every object and circumstance in the material world should be viewed as a means of serving Hashem (God).
 In line with Ramban, Rabbi Dessler defines nature as the arena of "Nisayon" (נסיון Hebrew: [spiritual] test) — i.e. one will engage in derech eretz in inverse proportion to his recognition of God's providential role. Rabbi Dessler thus advises (based on Mesillat Yesharim ) that one make his Torah fixed (kavua קבוע) and his derech eretz temporary and contingent on circumstances (arai עראי). Note that Rabbi Dessler stresses that "[one cannot] exploit a tendency to laziness in order to bolster his bitochon in Hashem ("trust in God") ... Trust in Hashem cannot be built up this way because the goal here is not to refrain from work but to attain certainty in bitochon in Hashem that leads to lessening worldly endeavors." (Michtav m'Eliyahu, vol. 1. pp. 194– 5)
 Given this conception of nature, Rav Dessler castigates preoccupation with technological enterprises and deems this the equivalent of idolatry. He writes that a civilization which is preoccupied with developing the external and the material, and neglects the inner moral content will eventually degenerate to its lowest possible depths: “Happiness in this world comes only as a result of being content with what one has in this world, and striving intensively for spirituality” and thus “the more that people try to improve this world, the more their troubles will backlash ... Instead of realizing they are drowning in materialism, they search for further ways to enhance physicality” (See Michtav m'Eliyahu, vol. 2 p. 236–310 and vol. 3 pp. 143–70).
 Rav Dessler writes that the acquisition of secular knowledge is unlikely to be other than at the expense of Torah knowledge. "The philosophy of Yeshiva education is directed towards one objective alone, to nurture Gedolei Torah ("greats in Torah knowledge") and Yirei Shamayim (those "fearful of Heaven") in tandem. For this reason university was prohibited to [yeshiva] students ... [educators] could not see how to nurture Gedolei Torah unless they directed all education towards Torah exclusively" (letter in Michtav m'Eliyahu vol. 3).

Modern Orthodox Judaism
Joseph B. Soloveitchik echoes Maimonides’ teaching. He writes that "the fundamental of providence is ... transformed into a concrete commandment, an obligation incumbent upon man. Man is obliged to broaden the scope and strengthen the intensity of the individual providence that watches over him. Everything is dependent on him; it is all in his hands" (Halakhic Man, p. 128).
 In line with this emphasis on proactivity, Modern Orthodox thought regards derech eretz, Man's involvement with the natural world, as a divine imperative inherent in the nature of creation (as opposed to as a "necessary evil" as above). Here, "worldly involvement" extends to a positive contribution to general society. This understanding is reflected both in Soloveitchik's conception as well as in the teachings of Samson Raphael Hirsch; see תורה ומדע - Torah Umadda, תורה עם דרך ארץ - Torah im Derech Eretz.
 Similarly, Soloveitchik, in The Lonely Man of Faith, mandates the involvement of human beings in technological activity. This is based on God's blessing to Adam and Eve "Fill the land and conquer it" (Genesis 1:28), which extends to the obligation of the imitation of God. The use and development of technology, then, is not characterised as "prideful", but rather is seen as obligatory upon man.
 Further, Madda, knowledge of the natural world and society, is regarded as vital in Modern Orthodox thought. This knowledge plays an obvious role in the facilitation of derech eretz and the development of technology. It is also seen as valuable as a complement to Torah study. This further reflects Maimonides, in that he, famously, defines science and philosophy as "Handmaidens" of Torah study — one could not be a learned Jew without this knowledge.

Particular divine providence in Hasidic philosophy

In the Middle Ages, the new discipline in Rabbinic Judaism of classic, Medieval Jewish rationalistic philosophy arose, exemplified by its leading figure Maimonides. It sought to bring the tradition in Western Philosophy of independent thinking from first principles, in support and harmony with rabbinic theology of the Talmud. In Rabbinic Judaism, this approach, which had its supporters and detractors, was called hakirah ("investigation") to distinguish from other traditions in Jewish thought. 

Another parallel tradition of kabbalah expressed a mystical exegesis of biblical and rabbinic texts, and a metaphysical theology. Both became part of the canon of Rabbinic literature. The classic figure in Jewish thought, Nachmanides, was one of the early exponents of kabbalah, though his Bible commentary avoids using the direct terminology of kabbalah. As the tradition of kabbalah developed it evolved through the successive stages of medieval kabbalah, exemplified in the Zohar, the 16th-century rational synthesis of Cordoveran Kabbalah, the subsequent new paradigm of cosmic rectification in Lurianic Kabbalah and the 18th-century popularisation of Jewish mysticism in Hasidism.

The teachings of Hasidic philosophy sought the inner divinity within the esoteric structures of kabbalah, by relating them to their internal correspondence in the daily spiritual life of man. It sought to awaken a personal, psychological perception of godliness in dveikut (mystical joy and cleaving to God). The interpretations of Judaism and Jewish philosophy in Hasidism taught new dimensions of divine unity, omnipresence and individual divine providence. In the new teaching of Yisrael Baal Shem Tov, the founder of Hasidism, divine providence governs every detail of Creation. He taught that "the movement of a leaf in the wind" is a part of the Divine purpose of Creation. Based on the Cosmic "Tikkun" (Rectification) of Lurianic Kabbalah, everything in creation is part of this messianic rectification, and if it were to be missing, then the rectification would be incomplete. The meaning of this can be understood by considering its background in the esoteric structures of kabbalah, especially the teachings of Isaac Luria. In these new doctrines, our physical world and all its details, take on cosmic significance in the divine scheme of creation. Every action and each person is significant, as it relates to the overall redemption of the fallen nitzutzot (divine sparks from the primordial catastrophe of the "Shattering of the Vessels" of the world of Tohu). The rectification can only be achieved in this lowest realm. This explains that the reason that most of the mitzvot of Judaism involve action is their metaphysical role in achieving the redemption of the hidden divinity in creation. In the words of Luria, every animate and inanimate object has a spiritual form of "soul" within its physical form, which is its continual creating source in the Divine Light. Even a stone would have this level of a "soul" though this is not like the living soul of a plant, the conscious soul of an animal, or the intelligent soul of man. It is rather its animating existence in the Divine Will, as in Jewish mysticism, creation is continuous and would revert to nothingness without the constant divine animation within it. Accordingly, in the words of Luria, "every leaf contains a soul that came into the world to receive a Rectification". Gilgul (the kabbalistic process of reincarnation), the rectification of an individual soul, becomes a microcosmic reflection in Lurianic Kabbalah, to the macrocosmic divine rectification. In Hasidism, the structural dynamics of this cosmic scheme are followed, but instead are related to their inner Divine dimensions in the direct psychological perception and life of man:

   
The Hasidic relation of the Jewish mystical tradition, to the daily life of the common folk, sanctified the world of the shtetl in the popular imagination. Its charismatic adaptions of the profound thought of Hasidic philosophy, entered Yiddish literature, where the ideas of gilgul and dybuk, and the direct immanent Presence of God, affected secular Jewish culture.

Divine unity in Hasidism

This mystical interpretation of particular Divine Providence is part of the wider Hasidic interpretation of God's Unity. The second section of the Hasidic text the Tanya by Schneur Zalman of Liadi (Shaar Hayichud Vehaemunah-Gate of Unity and Faith), brings the mystical panentheism of the Baal Shem Tov into philosophical explanation. It explains the Hasidic interpretation of God's Unity in the first two lines of the Shema, based upon their interpretation in kabbalah. The emphasis on divine omnipresence and immanence lies behind Hasidic joy and deveikut, and its stress on transforming the material into spiritual worship. In this internalisation of kabbalistic ideas, the Hasidic follower seeks to reveal the unity of hidden divinity in all activities of life. Nachman of Breslov teaches that big part of choices needs faith or, in other words, good relations are supported by faith. 

Medieval, Rationalist Jewish Philosophers, such as Maimonides, describe Biblical monotheism to mean that there is only one God, and his essence is a unique, simple, infinite unity. Jewish mysticism gives a further explanation, by distinguishing between God's essence and emanation. In kabbalah and especially Hasidism, God's unity means that there is nothing independent of his essence. The new doctrine in Lurianic Kabbalah of God's tzimtzum ("withdrawal"), received different interpretations after Isaac Luria, from the literal to the metaphorical. To Hasidism and Schneur Zalman, it is unthinkable for the withdrawal of God that "makes possible" creation to be taken literally. Tzimtzum only relates to the Ohr Ein Sof ("infinite light"), not the Ein Sof (divine essence) itself, and involved only apparent concealment, not actual concealment. God's unbounded essence is revealed in both complementary infinitude (infinite light) and finitude (finite light). The withdrawal was only the illusion of concealment of the infinite light into the essence of God, to allow the latent potentially finite light to emerge apparent to creation after the tzimtzum. God himself remains unaffected ("For I, the Lord, I have not changed" Malachi 3:6). His essence was one, alone, before creation, and still one, alone, after creation, without any change. As the tzimtzum was only the illusion of concealment, therefore God's unity is omnipresent. In the Baal Shem Tov's new interpretation, divine providence affects every detail of creation, as everything is part of the unfolding divine unity, and is a necessary part of the kabbalistic messianic rectification. This awareness of the loving purpose and significance of each individual, awakens mystical love and awe of God (deveikut).

Lower unity
Schneur Zalman explains that God's unity has two levels, that are both paradoxically true. The main text of Kabbalah, the Zohar, describes the first verse of the shema as the "Upper level Unity", and the second line ("Blessed be the Name of the Glory of His Kingdom forever") as the "Lower level Unity". Schneur Zalman gives the Hasidic explanation of this. In kabbalah, all creation is dependent on the immanent, potentially finite, "Light that Fills all Worlds", that each creation receives continually. Creation is a continuous process, as without the downward flow of spiritual light from God's will, creation would revert to nothingness. Lurianic Kabbalah extends the divine unity in this, by describing the particular nitzot (divine spark) enclothed within, that gives life to each entity. The Baal Shem Tov's Hasidic panentheism describes the further, complete unity of God with creation. In his interpretation, quoted by Schneur Zalman, the creative words of God of Genesis, through innumerable permutations of their Hebrew letters, themselves become each spiritual and physical entity of creation. This extends Luria's divine immanence to complete unity. Isaac Luria's doctrine of the tzimtzum (withdrawal of God), that made a "vacuum" within which finite creation could take place, is therefore not literal. It is only a concealment of God's creating light, and only from the perspective of creation. God remains in the vacuum exactly as before creation. In reality all creation is completely bittul-nullified to God's light, even though in our realm this utter dependence is presently concealed. From this perspective, of God knowing the creation on its own terms, creation exists, but the essence of anything is only the divine light that continuously recreates it from nothing. God is one, as creation takes place within God. "There is nothing outside of Him." This is the "Lower Level Unity".

Higher unity
In relation to God's essence, creation affects no change or withdrawal in the divine. "There is nothing but God". The ability to create can only come from the divine atzmut(essence), whose power of infinitude is described by the Tetragrammaton (name of God). However, "It is not the essence of the Divine to create Worlds and sustain them", as this ability is only external to the infinite essence. Creation only derives from God's revelatory "speech" (as in Genesis 1) and even this is unlike the external speech of Man, as it too remains "within" God. From the upper perspective of God knowing himself on his own terms, creation does not exist, as it is as nothing in relation to God's essence. This monistic acosmism is the "Upper Level Unity", as from this perspective, only God exists. The illusionism of this is not absolute, as the paradox means that both contradictory upper and lower levels of unity are true."The development of Kabbalah in three stages" from Inner.org. "Evolution"-Cordoveran Kabbalah, "Enclothement"-Lurianic Kabbalah, "Omnipresence"-Hasidic philosophy

Integration of providence in Hasidism with Maimonides
The school of Habad Hasidism sought to articulate Hasidic philosophy in intellectual systemisation. This was exemplified by the aim of the 5th Rebbe, Sholom Dovber Schneersohn, that his yeshiva academies should study Hasidic thought with the logical method of pilpul, traditionally used in Talmudic study. In the Hasidic teachings of Habad, this approach was used by each Rebbe in their public discourses and talks, with each successive leader aiming to bring down the philosophy of Hasidism into greater grasp and articulation. The 7th leader, Menachem Mendel Schneerson typically addressed Hasidic philosophy most often in informal, analytical talks. This approach to Hasidic mysticism enabled it to study the integration of other aspects of Jewish thought, into the Hasidic explanations. In Hasidic terminology, it takes a higher spiritual source in divinity to unite opposing, lower opinions. In Hasidic thought, Talmudic legislation, midrashic imagination, rationalist descriptions and kabbalistic structures are seen to reflect lower dimensions of a higher, essential Divine Unity. This method was used by the 7th Rebbe to address the topic of divine providence. In a series of talks, translated and published in English, the Lubavitcher Rebbe addresses the resolution between the Hasidic conception of divine providence, and its previous formulations in medieval Jewish philosophy and kabbalah. It sees the views of Maimonides and others as part of the new conception of the Baal Shem Tov.

References and note

External links
General discussion
 Jewish Encyclopedia entry
 Hashgachah Pratis: An Exploration of Divine Providence and Free Will, Rabbi Aryeh Leibowitz
 Articles on Divine Providence (chabad.org)
 The Study of Nature in Jewish thought, Rabbi Nachum Danzig
 Prayer and Divine Immutability, Rabbi Israel Chait
"Practical Endeavor and the Torah u-Madda Debate", Rabbi David Shatz

Specific approaches
 Miracles and the Natural Order in Nahmanides, Prof. David Berger
 The Purpose of Signs and Miracles According to the Ramban, Rabbi Ezra Bick
 Maimonides on Providence Moreh Nevuchim'', 3:17
 Maimonides on nature and miracles, Rabbi Moshe Taragin
 Miracles in Rambam’s Thought — a Function of Prophecy, David Guttmann
 Philosophic Differences between Rambam & Ramban, Rabbi David Bassous
 Maimonides' and Nachmanides' Perspectives on Miracles, Rabbi Bernard Fox
 The view of Rabbi Dessler
 The view of Rav Soloveichik (Archived)
 The Baal Shem Tov's conception of Divine Providence
 Maharal on Nature and Miracles (Hebrew)
The Alter of Novorodok

Hasidic thought
Jewish mysticism
Jewish philosophy
Jewish theology